Kopeika (Копейка) was a Russian retail chain that collapsed as a result of the Great Recession.

Kopeika was founded in 1998 with 38 stores. The grocer gained wider prominence when it was taken over by the ill-fated Yukos oil giant in 2002. On the latter's demise a controlling stake was sold to NIKOIL. In 2006 50% was sold on to another local chain by which time there were 267 stores and 4 distribution centers.

In 2010, Kopeyka was acquired by competitor Pyaterochka, part of the X5 Retail Group, for $1.65 billion. By the end of 2011, 616 Kopeyka stores had been rebranded and 44 stores had been shut down.

References

External links
YouTube Adverts 
Kopeika English website
Property Magazine International - X5 Retail Group completes acquisition of Kopeyka discounter

Supermarkets of Russia
Retail companies established in 1998
Retail companies of Russia
Convenience stores